Bombon may refer to:

 Bombon, Camarines Sur, a municipality in the Philippines
 Bombon, Seine-et-Marne, a commune in France
 Bombon (movie), a 2004 Argentine-Spanish drama film
 Café bombón, a coffee drink containing espresso and sweetened condensed milk

See also
 
 Bombones, a Spanish pop band
 Bombón (disambiguation)
 Bonbon (disambiguation)